The title Hero of Labor was awarded by the German Democratic Republic for supporting the socialist economy, usually by increasing factory output or agricultural yields. It was instituted on 19 April 1950 and was limited to 50 awards per year. A cash prize of up to 10,000 Marks was linked to each award.

Recipients 

 Hermann Axen
 Franz Dahlem
 Fritz Dallmann
 Luise Ermisch
 Kurt Hager
 Horst Heintze
 Adolf Hennecke
 Margot Honecker
 Erich Mielke
 Günter Mittag
 Willi Stoph
 Josef Wenig
 Ernst Wulf
 Solveig Leo

See also 
 Orders, decorations, and medals of East Germany
 Hero of Socialist Labour
 Hero of Labor (Vietnam)
 Hero of Labor (North Korea)

External links

 List of people awarded the Hero of Labour

Orders, decorations, and medals of East Germany
Awards established in 1950
1989 disestablishments in East Germany
1950 establishments in East Germany
Awards disestablished in 1990
Business and industry awards
Hero (title)